The Chambers of Commerce of Ireland, trading as Chambers Ireland is the federation of chambers of commerce for the Republic of Ireland.
 It is a member organisation of EUROCHAMBRES.

InBUSINESS magazine
InBUSINESS is the organisation's quarterly magazine. It runs awards for businesses and local authorities annually.

Member organisations

Arklow & District Chamber
Athlone Chamber
Ballina Chamber
Ballyhaunis Chamber
Bantry Chamber
Bray & District Chamber
Carrick-on-Shannon Chamber
Cavan Chamber
Cobh & Harbour Chamber
Cootehill Chamber
County Carlow Chamber
County Kildare Chamber
County Meath Chamber
County Tipperary Chamber
Drogheda & District Chamber
Dublin Chamber
Dún Laoghaire–Rathdown Chamber
Dundalk Chamber
Dungarvan & West Waterford Chamber
Ennis Chamber
Enniscorthy & District Chamber
Fingal Dublin Chamber
Galway Chamber
Gorey Chamber
Kilkenny Chamber
Laois Chamber
Letterkenny Chamber
Limerick Chamber
Longford Chamber
Mallow Chamber
Mullingar Chamber
New Ross & District Chamber
Northern Ireland Chamber of Commerce and Industry
Shannon Chamber
Sligo Chamber
South Dublin Chamber
Thurles Chamber
Tralee Chamber
Tullamore & District Chamber
Waterford Chamber
Westport Chamber
Wexford Chamber

References

External links
 
 

Chambers of commerce
Companies of the Republic of Ireland
Companies based in Dublin (city)